Meadowview Biological Research Station is a non-profit 501(c)(3) organization dedicated to preserving and restoring rare wetland plants, habitats and associated ecosystems on the coastal plain of Maryland and Virginia. It was created in 1995 with the specific goal or restoring the rare yellow pitcher plant (Sarracenia flava), the purple pitcher plant (Sarracenia purpurea), and associate species to pitcher plant bogs or seepage wetlands in their historic ranges.

Most pitcher plant habitats have been destroyed in this critical mid-Atlantic region to the point where less than 100 yellow pitchers plants were left in just two natural sites in southern Virginia by 2007. Meadowview worked to deal with, and reverse, the process of extirpation of local and regional pitcher plants habitats, flora, and fauna.

Accomplishments
Meadowview has had a number of notable accomplishments in conservation efforts of pitcher plants and associate species.

Meadowview has successfully purchased a  preserve in southern Virginia called the Joseph Pines Preserve, which is dedicated to preserving the native Virginia longleaf pine/pitcher plant ecosystem. A total of 18 indigenous, rare plant species are being reintroduced on the property as part of an integrated ecosystem restoration. To date Meadowview has protected a total of six native Virginia yellow pitcher plant populations on its preserve (4 having been extirpated in the past ten years). The group also aims to capture the entire native Virginia longleaf pine germplasm on this property.
Meadowview has expanded Joeseph Pines Preserve by an additional  as of June 2012
Meadowview has also reintroduced two populations of the federally endangered mountain sweet pitcher plant (Sarracenia jonesii) to its historic range in North Carolina to include the Biltmore Estate, under a National Fish and Wildlife Foundation Grant, and Falling Creek Camp for Boys.

References

External links
 Meadowview Biological Research Station

501(c)(3) organizations
Biological stations
1995 establishments in the United States
Environmental organizations based in Maryland
Environmental organizations based in Virginia
Wetland conservation in the United States